William John Birch (February 1842 – 12 May 1920) was an English settler in New Zealand. He leased with his brother a large area in inland Patea, central North Island, for a sheep run.

Early life
Birch was born in February 1842 in Oxfordshire, England. He was the second son of William John Birch of Pudlicote House, Oxfordshire, England. His father had inherited wealth, but lost much of it in poorly-performing investments.

After schooling in England and Germany, Birch took a two-year course at the Royal Agricultural College in Cirencester. He came to New Zealand on the Wild Duck in February 1860.

Birch initially was in Wellington. He took a position in the Hawke's Bay area, with the runholder Ashton St Hill, by the Tukituki River. He rose from cadet to manager there. 

Azim, William's elder brother, had joined the 44th (East Essex) Regiment of Foot, becoming an ensign in 1855. The regiment took part in the Crimean War, and in August 1857 left for India. Azim sold out his commission as lieutenant, in 1863. Both brothers served in campaigns of the New Zealand Wars during the 1860s.

The sheep run
The Birch brothers, Azim and William, leased a sheep run from Māori in the Kaimanawa-Oruamatua Block, after negotiations begun in 1867. They had relied on the backing of Donald McLean, succeeding against a number of other interested parties.

The brothers took on Robert Thompson Batley in 1868. In that year Te Kooti's War broke out. Batley drove the farm's sheep to Thomas McDonnell at Poutu. He left the Birches to work locally with Hēnare Kepa; then by 1874 became their station manager. Wool from the farm needed to be taken to Napier, an arduous journey for packhorses and mules carrying packs weighing  over rough ground, passing the Gentle Annie Summit near Tiniroto, and the Ngaruroro Gorge. In time there were upwards of 75,000 sheep on the run. Batley left what was by then the Erewhon Estate after ten years, going into business on his own account.

The Birch holdings were covered by the Owhaoko and Kaimanawa-Oruamatua Reinvestigation of Title Act of 1886. It followed a parliamentary inquiry during that year, involving also the Studholme family. This was a substantive investigation, one of the parties being Rēnata Kawepō with James Carroll as counsel; in contrast to a sketchy hearing held in 1875.

Homestead and division
The Birch Homestead at Moawhango was built by Azim and William Birch in 1868. William was appointed a Justice of the Peace in 1878. 

The brothers divided the station in 1897, Azim taking the homestead, and renaming it as Oruamatua. On retiring, Azim sold his holding to Thomas Lowry and Edward Watt. In 1906, he was living in London.

The "Erewhon" name, from Samuel Butler's 1872 book of that name, stuck to William Birch's holdings. At the 1920 auction after his death, his property with his adopted son was put up for sale as the Erewhon Estate.

Later life
In 1905 William Birch was resident at Marton. He died at Thoresby, Marton, on 12 May 1920, at age 78.

Family
Birch was married in 1875, in England. At Hathern, Leicestershire, he wedded Ethel Larden, youngest daughter of the late Rev. George Edge Larden. Her mother Mary Lydia Fanny Bucknill (died 1901) married Larden in 1847. Ethel — forenames Lydia Etheldreda — is known as an artist under the name Lydia Larden. 

On Birch's return to New Zealand, Erewhon Farm being accessible only by packhorse, he built a house, Stoneycroft, in Hastings, as the family home. The couple had no children. They adopted William's nephew William Charles Caccia, who came to New Zealand in 1884, and changed his surname to Caccia-Birch in 1893.

Notes

1842 births
1920 deaths
People from Oxfordshire
Settlers of New Zealand
New Zealand farmers
Pastoralists
History of Manawatū-Whanganui